The Independence Hall of Korea (Dongnip kinyeomgwan) is a Korean history museum in Cheonan, South Korea. Opened on August 15, 1987, it has the largest exhibition facility in South Korea, with a total floor area of 23,424 m2. The museum focuses on the independence movements of the Japanese colonial period; however, the first exhibition hall, The Hall of National Heritage, is dedicated to the period ranging from prehistoric times to the Joseon dynasty. It has seven indoor exhibition halls and a Circle Vision Theater.

Exhibition and facilities 
 Exhibition Hall: There are seven exhibition spaces, which are composed of large space, small space, and special exhibition room.
The first exhibition shows artifacts and data that are related to the overcomed national crisis, from the prehistoric age to the late Joseon dynasty in 1860 and they are:

-       Dolmen Model, a tomb from Bronze Age made of stones. South Korea holds 40% of Dolmens of entire world and they are acknowledge as UNESCO World Heritage in 2000.

-       A Seven Pronged Sword dated 369 and it represents the relationship between Baekje and Japan since it was a gift from the king of Baekje to Japanese royal family.

-       Roof-end Tile with human-face design with on the back a trace of actual use in the building.

-       Dragon Head Statue made of stone, a decoration in stylobates of buildings. It assumes that it prevents from evil spirits.

-       Annals of the Joseon Dynasty, a book with 472 years of history and it contains all areas from politics to culture.

-       A manual that shows the interpretation of Hangeul and its usage with also the introduction written by King Sejong the Great.

-       A re-created model of a water clock called “Jagyeokru” that has a bell, gong and drum that produce sound at fixed times.

-       Re-created model of the Turtle Ship (“Geobukseon”).

The second exhibition covers the period from the 1860s to the 1940s. During these years Korea began its modernization to the Japanese colonization period. It contains:

-       The First Issue of the first Korean newspaper published by private sector called “The Independent (Dongnip Shinmun)”

-       The Preamble of the Eulsa Treaty, an illegal treaty by which diplomatic right of Korean Empire was deprived by a special envoy of Japanese Emperor and also its directed Model

-       Daily commodities exploited by Japanese Imperialism that were part of the so-called “public offering” to make a compromise since there were not enough supplies due the aggressive war

-       A census register with a new family name created and personal name changed since the Japanese Imperialism forced Korean people to change their names in Japanese names.

-       Stones carved with the sentence “Imperial People’s Oath” and a directed model of prison where Korean independence activists were tortured and oppressed to prevent any independence movement.

The third exhibition concentrates on the events of the March 1st Independence Movement and it contains:

-       The Declaration of Independence of 1919 where Koreans showed their resistance to Japanese colonial rule and declared independence with the slogan “Long live Korean independence”

-       A compiled manuscript of a Korean dictionary that was written by the Joseon Language Society.

The fourth exhibition hall with the title “Meaning and value of the Korean independence movement” aims to display how the independence movement spread across the nation and it represented a torch for the future.

In this hall there are 4 different paths that the visitor can take advantage of and get to know more about the Korean history and atmosphere during those years.

The first path, “Path of Resolve” leads to reflect the meaning of an independence movement.

The “Path of Activism” is the second path that shows different aspects and highlights of the independence movement. The third path, “Path of Unification” is where the visitor can witnesses the achievements made since the restoration of independence and there is also an opportunity to listen to different voices that describe what kind of nation Korean activists dreamed of.

The last path, “Path of Echoes”, is about remembrance and legacy and is a way to understand the value of the independence movement and also it could be an inspiration to transfer these values to the coming generations.

The fifth exhibition hall is called “Patriotic struggle for national independence” and it covers the anti-Japanese armed resistance that occurred in areas both inside and outside the nation.

In this exhibition you can see:

-       A statue of unknown independence troops and it was sculptured to commemorate their patriotism and their sacrifices to fight Japanese forces,

-      A Korean flag (Taegeukgi) used in the independence army force during Fengwutung battle in 1920 and another flag that contains the signatures of the Korean restoration Army,

-      A receipt that was issued to a person who supported the fund for the independence movement by Western Route Army,

-      The declaration of Joseon Revolution written by Sin Chae-ho.

The sixth exhibition named “Establishing the Great Korea” covers people's independence movement and the activities of the Korean Provisional Government which is the first democratic government and also the supreme organization of independence movement established after the March 1st Movement.

In this exhibition we can find:

-      A dome-shaped symbol where are played the most typical resistance poems and also on the wall is played in 360 degree directions the movie clip “Inextinguishable Flame” which symbolize Korean people's will of resistance.

-      A scene of Gwanju Student Independence Movement and also wax figures sculptures of the Korean Provisional Government

The Independence Hall of Korea also hosts different events across the year.

Held every year on March 1 the Independence Movement Day Memorial event is a national holiday that commemorates nonviolent demonstrations for independence. On this day the Independence Hall of Korea holds a large-scale re-enactment of the Movement.

Another event is held every year on May 5 is the Children's Day Event that promotes children's happiness and cherish their personalities and the independence hall of Korea hosts various performances and hands-on events targeted towards children.

The Liberation Day is celebrated every year on August 15 and it commemorates the liberation of Korea from Japanese colonial rule back in 1945. This is the largest event put on by the Independence hall of Korea with special exhibits and different performances.

Held every year in early-mid October the Fall Cultural Zone is an opportunity to celebrate the arrive of Fall season with music concerts, performances and hands-on events for families.

In the greetings on the official page the president of the Independence Hall of Korea says: “The Independence Hall embodies the spirit of the Korean nation and informs people of the Korean people’s dignity. […]We will remember the numerous patriots who willingly died for Korea’s independence and we continue to work hard on their behalf for national progress and for world peace.

In the Independence Hall, please feel the spirit of the Korean people who love freedom and peace.”

Other important elements can be found in the exhibition such as:
House of Peoples: It was designed as a symbol of the Independence Hall and a central commemoration hall, imitating Daedeungjeon of Suseok Temple.
 The large yard of the people: It is a square in front of the house of the nation, the central part is made of granite pavement, and the outside is made of Anyang stones and grass finish.
 Stereoscopic Movie: A 4D animation about modern Korean history is screened.
 The Garden of Unification Desire: A place of public participation is set up as a superintendent for peaceful reunification and willingness to be transferred to future generations.
 The Tower of the people: It is a sculpture of 52m in height, and expressed the national emergency.
 Unbelievable Korean Awards: Located in the center of a large hall inside the House of the Peoples, it is a symbol of the unbearable independence spirit and strong Korean image.
 Place of Memorial: Located at the top of the Independence Hall, it was set up to celebrate the patriotic line.
 Taegeukgi Hanmadang: It is a place to host the 8,15 Taegeukgi during the year.
In March 2013, actress Song Hye-kyo donated the production cost of braille brochures for the Hall. With the help of scholar Seo Kyung-duk of Sungshin Women's University, 1,000 copies are to be made available with more in the planning, as not many museums provide braille brochures for the blind. She reportedly decided to help after playing a blind woman in 2013 Seoul Broadcasting System drama That Winter, the Wind Blows.

References

External links

 Independence Hall of Korea official site
Independence Hall of Korea at Liberation Day (Korea)

Cheonan
History museums in South Korea
Museums in South Chungcheong Province